Jan Szymański may refer to:

Jan Szymański (wrestler) (1960–2005), Polish Olympic wrestler
Jan Szymański (speed skater) (born 1989), Polish long track speed skater